is a Shinto shrine located in Tsukiji, Chūō, Tokyo. It is an Inari shrine that was built on the water's edge when this part of Tokyo (then Edo) was created from landfill after the Great Fire of Meireki in 1657.  The name of the shrine literally means "protection from waves."

After the Tsukiji fish market was established in its present location after the 1923 Great Kantō earthquake, the Namiyoke Inari Shrine became an unofficial guardian shrine for the marketplace and its traders.  The courtyard of the shrine is dotted with various memorial plaques and carvings donated by trade groups in the marketplace.

Buildings and structures in Chūō, Tokyo
Shinto shrines in Tokyo
1659 establishments in Japan
Tsukiji
Inari shrines